Baudolino is a 2000 novel by Umberto Eco about the adventures of a man named Baudolino in the known and mythical Christian world of the 12th century.

Baudolino was translated into English in 2001 by William Weaver. The novel presented a number of particular difficulties in translation, not the least of which is that there are ten or so pages written in a made-up language that is a mixture of Latin, medieval Italian and other languages (intended to reconstruct how a barely-literate Italian peasant boy of the 12th century would have tried to write in the vernacular).

Saint Baudolino, a historically-attested hermit of the eighth century, is the Patron Saint of Alessandria, and thus it would be natural for a boy born there to bear his name.

Plot summary
In the year of 1204, Baudolino of Alessandria enters Constantinople, unaware of the Fourth Crusade that has thrown the city into chaos. In the confusion, he meets Niketas Choniates and saves his life. Niketas is amazed by his language genius, speaking many languages he has never heard, and Baudolino begins to recount his life story to Niketas.

His story begins in 1155, when Baudolino – a highly talented Italian peasant boy – is sold to and adopted by the emperor Frederick I. At court and on the battlefield, he is educated in reading and writing Latin and learns about the power struggles and battles of northern Italy at the time. He is sent to Paris to become a scholar.

In Paris, he gains friends (such as the Archpoet, Abdul, Robert de Boron and Kyot, the purported source of Wolfram von Eschenbach's Parzival) and learns about the legendary kingdom of Prester John. From this event onward, Baudolino dreams of reaching this fabled land.

The earlier parts of the story follow the general historical and geographical outlines of 12th-century Europe, with special emphasis on the Emperor Frederick's futile efforts to subdue the increasingly independent and assertive city states of Northern Italy. Baudolino, both a beloved adopted son to the Emperor and a loyal native of the newly founded and highly rebellious town of Alessandria, plays a key role in reconciliation between the Emperor and the Alessandria townspeople, who are led by Baudolino's biological father; a way is found for the Emperor to recognize Alessandria's independence without losing face. (It is no accident that Alessandria is Umberto Eco's own hometown.) During the siege, Baudolino works on the side of Frederick Barbarossa, but concocts a plan to help win the Alessandrian townspeople independence. He attempts to convince the emperor's forces that Alessandria is more prepared for a siege than them through stuffing a cow with the last of Alessandria's wheat and sends the cow out to the Emperor's forces. When the cow is cut open, it reveals a full belly of wheat. The emperor's forces are convinced that Alessandria is not worth besieging, and thus leave.

The incident of the death of Emperor Frederick, while on the Third Crusade, is a key element of the plot. This part involves an element of secret history – the book asserts that Emperor Frederick had not drowned in a river, as history records, but died mysteriously at night while hosted at the castle of a sinister Armenian noble. This part also constitutes a historical detective mystery – specifically, a historical locked room mystery – with various suspects suggested, each of whom had a clever means of killing the Emperor, and with Baudolino acting as the detective.

After the Emperor's death, Baudolino and his friends set off on a long journey, encompassing 15 years, to find the Kingdom of Prester John. From the moment when they depart eastwards, the book becomes pure fantasy – the lands which the band travels bearing no resemblance to the continent of Asia at that or any other historical time, being rather derived from the various myths which Europeans had about Asia – including the aforementioned Christian myth of the Kingdom of Prester John, as well as the Jewish myth of the Ten Lost Tribes and the River Sambation, and some earlier accounts provided by Herodotos. Baudolino meets eunuchs, unicorns, Blemmyes, skiapods and pygmies. At one point, he falls in love with a female satyr-like creature who recounts to him the full Gnostic creation myth (Gnosticism is a pervasive presence in another of Eco's novels, Foucault's Pendulum). Philosophical debates are mixed with comedy, epic adventure and creatures drawn from medieval bestiaries.

After many disastrous adventures, the destruction of Prester John's Kingdom by the White Huns followed by a long stint of slavery at the hands of the Old Man of the Mountain, Baudolino and surviving members of his band of friends return to Constantinople undergoing the agony of the Fourth Crusade – the book's starting point. Niketas Choniates helps Baudolino discover the truth about how the Emperor Frederick died – with shattering results for Baudolino and his friends.

Characters in Baudolino

Invented by Eco
Baudolino – young man of Alessandria, protagonist, apparently a reference to the patron saint.
The monopod Gavagai, a reference to Quine's example of indeterminacy of translation.
The putative successors of Hypatia of Alexandria
Deacon John, leprous sub-ruler of Pndapetzim, apparently based on Baldwin IV of Jerusalem.

Other fictional or legendary beings
Kyot
Gagliaudo Aulari, legendary saviour of Alessandria, and his wife, who are Baudolino's biological parents
Prester John
Basilisk
Manticore
Chimera
Satyrs
Blemmyes
Panotti
Unicorn   
Cynocephaly
Roc

Historical
Frederick Barbarossa
Niketas Choniates
Rainald of Dassel
The Old Man of the Mountain
Pope Alexander III
Beatrice I, Countess of Burgundy
The Archpoet (unknown except through his poetry)
Otto of Freising
A member of the ancient Artsruni noble clan
Andronicus I Comnenus
Stephen Hagiochristophorites
Isaac II Angelos
The Venerable Bede
White Huns
Enrico Dandolo
Robert de Boron

Release details
2000, Italy, Bompiani, Pub date ? ? 2000, hardback (First edition, Italian)
2001, Brazil, Editora Record, Pub date ? ? 2001, paperback (Portuguese edition)
2002, UK, Secker & Warburg, Pub date 15 October 2002, hardback 
2002, USA, Harcourt, Pub date 15 October 2002, hardcover 
2002, France, Grasset and Fasquelle, Pub date 12 February 2002, paperback (French edition)
2002, USA, Recorded Books, Pub date ? October 2002, audiobook (cassette edition)
2003, Italy, Fabbri - RCS Libri, Pub date ? January 2003, paperback (Italian edition)
2003, USA, Harvest Books, Pub date 6 October 2003, paperback

External links

 An interview with Umberto Eco for La Repubblica, September 11, 2000 
 An excerpt from the book 
 Umberto Eco Wiki: Baudolino - wiki annotations of Baudolino

2000 novels
20th-century Italian novels
Bompiani books
Cultural depictions of Frederick I, Holy Roman Emperor
Cultural depictions of Hypatia
Fiction with unreliable narrators
Novels by Umberto Eco
Novels set in the 12th century
Novels set in the 13th century
Roc (mythology)
Postmodern novels